Jeziorki  is a village in the administrative district of Gmina Augustów, within Augustów County, Podlaskie Voivodeship, in north-eastern Poland.

The village has a population of 320.

References

Villages in Augustów County